Katmerciler is a Turkish defense and automotive industry company  established in 1985 in Izmir. The company produces Hızır 4x4 infantry mobility, riot control, sanitation, and transportation vehicles and fire trucks. Katmerciler is a provider of subsystem production and is a solution partner of automotive and truck manufacturers such as Ford, BMC, Hyundai, Isuzu, Iveco, MAN, Mercedes, Mitsubishi, Renault, Scania, and Volvo.

Katmerciler became a public company traded on Borsa Istanbul in 2010. In 2016, Katmerciler opened a production facility for R&D and production activities for the defense industry in Ankara.

Gallery

References

Added more citations  

Organizations established in 1985
Turkish industries
Bus manufacturers of Turkey
Truck manufacturers of Turkey
Military vehicle manufacturers
Turkish brands
Companies listed on the Istanbul Stock Exchange
Defence companies of Turkey
Vehicle manufacturing companies established in 1985